Katherine Rotan Drinker (1889 – March 15, 1956) was an American physician.

Early life
Katherine Rotan was born in 1889 to mother Kate Sturm McCall Rotan and father Edward Rotan of Waco, Texas. She was one of nine children.

Education
Drinker attended Bryn Mawr College, graduating in 1910. She then attended the Woman's Medical College of Pennsylvania, graduating in 1914 with her medical degree.

Career
In 1916, Drinker began a job at Harvard University School of Public Health. She and her husband researched the Radium Girls, industrial workers who became ill after regularly ingesting minute amounts of radium. Their publication on the subject is now regarded as "a classic in the field". When the Journal of Industrial Hygiene was established in 1919, Drinker was one of its first managing editors.

Death
Drinker died on March 15, 1956, in Cataumet, Massachusetts, at the age of 66. She died of leukemia.

Personal life
Drinker married Cecil Kent Drinker in 1910. They had a daughter, Anne Sandwith Zinsser, and a son, Cecil K. Drinker, Jr.

References

1889 births
1956 deaths
Harvard University alumni
American physicians
Place of birth missing